William George Jamieson (born 27 April 1963) is a former football player, who played as a central defender for several clubs in the Scottish Football League, including Hibernian and Heart of Midlothian.

Jamieson won the Scottish First Division (second tier title) four times: with Hibs in 1980–81, with Hamilton Academical in 1985–86 and 1987–88 and with Dundee in 1991–92. He was signed by Hearts in December 1994, transferring from Partick Thistle (where he had been club captain) in exchange for Wayne Foster. He moved on to Ayr United where he added a Second Division (third tier) title to his medal collection in 1996–97.

Jamieson later played for junior club Newtongrange Star and managed the club for six months in 2002.

References

External links 
 Newcastle Fans profile

1963 births
Living people
Footballers from Barnsley
Association football central defenders
English footballers
Hibernian F.C. players
Hamilton Academical F.C. players
Dundee F.C. players
Partick Thistle F.C. players
Heart of Midlothian F.C. players
Ayr United F.C. players
Coleraine F.C. players
Scottish Football League players
NIFL Premiership players
English football managers
Tynecastle F.C. players
Anglo-Scots
Scottish football managers
Scottish Junior Football Association managers
Footballers from Edinburgh
Newtongrange Star F.C. managers